Edgardo Antonio Miranda Beiro (born May 3, 1982), better known as Joey Montana, is a Panamanian reggaeton singer. He is best known for the hit singles "Picky" and his collaboration with Sebastián Yatra, "Suena El Dembow".

Biography 
After five years of career with "La Factoría", he left the group to pursue his solo career. In 2003, he received a physiotherapist. In July 2004, he composed a song that was a success, so it was recommended to be a solo singer. He was there when he released his first album titled Sin Cadenas, in which he had the collaboration of Ángel López (former member of Son by Four) in the single "Que Dios Te Castigue", produced by Predikador. Later in 2010, he released his second album, Flow Con Clase, which includes the national hit singles "La Melodía", "Tus Ojos No Me Ven" and his second collaboration with Ángel López on "No Lo Vuelvo a Hacer". In 2014, Montana released his third album, Único, with the album's title track achieving success in Panama and the United States, where it reached number 35 on the US Billboard Latin Airplay chart.

In 2015, he released the song "Picky" and quickly became a huge success in Latin America and Spain. The song topped the charts in Mexico and was certified Diamond. It also reached number two in Spain and was certified four-times Platinum. Additionally, it reached the top-twenty in Panama and the US Billboard Hot Latin Songs chart, becoming Montana's breakthrough song, and managing to sign with his current label Universal Music Latin. In 2016, Montana was one of the coaches on the second season of La Voz Ecuador, where he wins the hearts and respect of all Ecuadorian peoples, where he has his greatest number of followers.

In September 2017, Montana released his collaboration with Colombian singer Sebastián Yatra, "Suena El Dembow", which became his first number-one hit in Panama, and was certified two-times Platinum in Mexico and Spain. Following this, Montana achieved several chart-topping singles in Panama, including "Rosas o espinas", "Viral Pisadinha", "Ya no más" and "Desesperado (Voy a Tomar)". To date, Montana is the Panamanian act with the most number-one songs in its home country.

Discography

Studio albums

Singles

As featured artist 

'Notes

References

External links

1982 births
Living people
People from Boquete District
21st-century Panamanian male singers
21st-century Panamanian singers
Panamanian reggaeton musicians
Universal Music Latin Entertainment artists
Capitol Latin artists